Fernando Miranda (born 14 October 1997) is an Argentine professional footballer who plays as a midfielder for Estudiantes de Buenos Aires, on loan from Ferro Carril Oeste.

Career
Miranda started his career with Ferro Carril Oeste, signing for their youth system in 2008. Alejandro Orfila promoted the midfielder into his senior squad during the 2018–19 Primera B Nacional campaign, selecting Miranda for his professional debut on 24 September 2018 during a defeat to Atlético de Rafaela. He featured in three further fixtures in 2018, which included his first start against Los Andes on 30 September. In January 2022, Miranda moved to Estudiantes de Buenos Aires on a one-year loan deal.

Career statistics
.

References

External links

1997 births
Living people
Place of birth missing (living people)
Argentine footballers
Association football midfielders
Primera Nacional players
Ferro Carril Oeste footballers
Estudiantes de Buenos Aires footballers